"Feel the Sunshine" is a 1995 song by British drum and bass producer Alex Reece featuring vocals by singer Deborah Anderson, who also co-wrote the lyrics. It was included on Reece's debut album, So Far, which was released in September 1996. The song peaked at number 69 on the UK Singles Chart in 1995. A re-release in May 1996 containing remixes charted higher, peaking at number 26. On the UK Dance Singles Chart, the song was more successful, peaking at number two. It is now widely regarded as one of the most classic drum and bass songs.

Background and release
Reece began DJing in the late 1980s. In 1992, Jack Smooth offered Reece a trainee studio engineer job, and Reece went on to engineer for Smooth on many of the early Basement Records releases. Reece first tried house (recording with his brother, Oscar, under the name of Exodus), but graduated to drum and bass. Though his preferred genres were acid house and Detroit techno, Reece would become known for jungle and drum 'n' bass in the mid-1990s. 

"Feel the Sunshine" was released on December 4, 1995 by Blunted and Island Records. It was made available as a 10", 12" and CD single, and became successful in clubs. The track was A-listed by BBC Radio One and, at one stage, was getting 26 plays a week. In 1996, it was re-released and this time even more successful. Featured vocalist on the track, Deborah Anderson's vocals were recorded at London's Eden studio on to Dat from which Reece then sampled the vocals.

Critical reception
Larry Flick from Billboard wrote that "with the drum'n'bass/electronic revolution raging to mainstream heights, the time is right for Reece to break out of the underground. This is one of numerous highlights on the U.K. producer/composer's sterling stateside debut." He added that his "ambient keyboards and staccato beats are warmed by the presence of guest vocalist Deborah Anderson, who has a quality not unlike Bjork, but smoother and far more mainstream-friendly." Tim Haslett from CMJ called the song "blissful". A reviewer from Music Week gave it three out of five, saying, "There have been some varying takes on jungle recently and Reece's understated, melodic drum and bass excursions with a jazz tinge will find him a wider audience in the near future." 

Brad Beatnik from the magazine's RM Dance Update rated it four out of five, adding that the producer "makes his Blunted debut with a rich, atmospheric tune. The remix makes the most of the strings and organ feel, the original uses less of the Bjork-like vocal over more minimal drum and bass beats." Upon the 1996 re-release, the magazine's Sarah Davis said, "It was an astute choice as a single, encapsulating Reece's warm sound, and its hints of house and use of vocals made it radio-friendly." Calvin Bush from Muzik commented, "YES, he really is worth all the purple prose and exaggerated metaphors! After what seems like eons, Reece finally delivers his major label debut and the phrases "bloody essential" and "stick this in your jazz pipe and smoke it, son" spring to mind." John Perry from NME noted "the divine summer breeze" of the song, stating that Reece "breakbeats his insistently over low-rent electro squiggles and honey-dripping vocals drape like velvet over a chaise longue. Reece has rubbed all the dirt from the surface of harcore and polished it until it reflects the sun."

Music video
A music video was produced to promote the single. It takes place at an underground party. Singer Deborah Anderson sings as she makes her way through dark passages in the underground. She wears dark make up on her eyelids and has feathers in her hair. A DJ spins records and people dances around her. Towards the end, Anderson reaches the surface and comes out into the daylight.

Track listing

 12" single (1995)
"Feel the Sunshine" (Vocal Mix)
"Feel the Sunshine" (Original Mix)
"Jazz Master" (Alex's Funky Mix)

 CD single (1995)
"Feel the Sunshine" (Vocal Mix) – 6:18
"Feel the Sunshine" (Original Mix) – 5:42
"Jazz Master" (Original Mix) – 5:36
"Jazz Master" (Alex's Funky Mix) – 4:49

 12" single (Remixes) (1996)
"Feel the Sunshine" (DJ Pulse Remix) – 5:44
"Jazz Master" (DJ Krust Remix) – 6:50
"Jazz Master" (Kruder & Dorfmeister Remix) – 8:23

 CD single (Remixes) (1996)
"Feel the Sunshine" (Original Radio Edit) – 3:53
"Feel the Sunshine" (DJ Pulse Remix) – 5:46
"Jazz Master" (DJ Krust Remix) – 6:51
"Jazz Master" (Kruder and Dorfmeister Remix) – 8:24

Charts

References

 

1995 songs
1995 singles
1996 singles
Drum and bass songs
Island Records singles